Innovation Park may refer to:
 Innovation Park (Florida State University)
 Innovation Park (Pennsylvania State University)
 Innovation Park (University of Missouri System)
 Innovation Park (University of Wisconsin–Milwaukee)